The discography of Ekatarina Velika, a Serbian alternative rock band from Belgrade, formed in 1982, consists of seven studio albums, three live album and two compilation albums.

Studio albums

Live albums

Compilation albums

References

Discographies of Serbian artists
Rock music group discographies